William Henry Seward is an outdoor bronze sculpture of William H. Seward by artist Randolph Rogers, located in Madison Square in Manhattan, New York. Dedicated on September 27, 1876, it believed to be the city's first monument depicting a New York resident. The portrait statue is set on a red Levante marble pedestal.

See also
 Sites and works regarding William H. Seward

References

External links
 

1876 establishments in New York (state)
1876 sculptures
Bronze sculptures in Manhattan
Monuments and memorials in Manhattan
Outdoor sculptures in Manhattan
Statues in New York City
Flatiron District